A scuffler is a word in Yorkshire dialect originating from the Castleford area meaning a large bread cake. This bread is always baked in a roughly triangular shape and is similar to the Northumbrian stottie, but lighter.

Scufflers often have a small amount of flour on the top.

See also
 List of bread rolls

References

Yorkshire cuisine
British breads